Tangasseri Lighthouse or Thangassery Lighthouse is situated at Tangasseri in Kollam city of the Indian state of Kerala. It is one of the two lighthouses in the Kollam Metropolitan Area and is maintained by the Cochin Directorate General of Lighthouses and Lightships. Tangasseri Lighthouse is one of the most visited lighthouses in Kerala.

History 
Prior to construction of the lighthouse, the British East India company had installed a tower with an oil lamp. In 1902 the present Tangasseri Lighthouse was completed, which by 1930 had suffered cracks in the tower that required jacketing masonry to be installed. The light source was modified in 1932, 1940, 1962, 1967, 1990 and 1994.

In 2016, the Tangasseri Lighthouse got an elevator facility for its visitors.

Location 
The lighthouse is located on the coast at Tangasseri in Kollam city and is the one of the locations in India that still maintains Anglo-Indian culture. Tangasseri is home to remnants of an ancient Portuguese built coastal defence, the St Thomas Fort, a Portuguese Cemetery, a canal, the ancient Port of Quilon and the Infant Jesus Cathedral.

Visitors are allowed access to the lighthouse between 11 am and 5 pm on all days except on Mondays.

Gallery

See also 

 List of lighthouses in India

References

External links 

 

Lighthouses in Kerala
Lighthouses completed in 1902
1902 establishments in British India
Buildings and structures in Kollam